The scaly whipray (Brevitrygon imbricata) is a species of stingray in the family  Dasyatidae, found in the tropical Indo-West Pacific oceans from the Red Sea and Mauritius to Indonesia.
 
The scaly whipray is found in inshore coastal waters, typically in estuarine habitats. Some uncertainty exists over the details of its habitat preference and full range due to confusion with the very similar Himantura walga, and reports from Tonlé Sap ("Great Lake") possibly refer to Dasyatis laosensis. The disc width of the scaly whipray is equal to its disc length, and the tail is shorter than the body. The ventral surface of the disc is entirely white.  Young and adults feed on benthic invertebrates, and juveniles may be present in mangroves.

They migrate between saltwater and freshwater, though not for the purpose of breeding.

Reproduction is ovoviviparous.

References

scaly whipray
scaly whipray